Łukasz Kubot and Marcelo Melo won the title, defeating Murray and Skupski in the final, 7–6(7–5), 7–5.

Rajeev Ram and Joe Salisbury were the defending champions, but they withdrew from the tournament before their quarterfinal match against Jamie Murray and Neal Skupski.

Seeds

Draw

Draw

Qualifying

Seeds

Qualifiers
  Karol Drzewiecki /  Szymon Walków

Qualifying draw

References

External links
 Main draw

Erste Bank Open - Doubles
2020 Doubles
2020 in Austrian tennis